Artemisia Lomi or Artemisia Gentileschi (8 July 1593) was an Italian Baroque painter. Gentileschi is considered among the most accomplished seventeenth-century artists, initially working in the style of Caravaggio. She was producing professional work by the age of 15. In an era when women had few opportunities to pursue artistic training or work as professional artists, Gentileschi was the first woman to become a member of the Accademia di Arte del Disegno in Florence and she had an international clientele.

Many of Gentileschi's paintings feature women from myths, allegories, and the Bible, including victims, suicides, and warriors. Some of her best known subjects are Susanna and the Elders (particularly the 1610 version in Pommersfelden), Judith Slaying Holofernes (her 1614–1620 version is in the Uffizi gallery), and Judith and Her Maidservant (her version of 1625 is in the Detroit Institute of Arts).

Gentileschi was known for being able to depict the female figure with great naturalism and for her skill in handling colour to express dimension and drama.

Her achievements as an artist were long overshadowed by the story of Agostino Tassi raping her when she was a young woman and her participation in his trial. For many years Gentileschi was regarded as a curiosity, but her life and art have been reexamined by scholars in the 20th and 21st centuries. She is now regarded as one of the most progressive and expressive painters of her generation, with the recognition of her talents exemplified by major exhibitions at internationally esteemed fine art institutions, such as the National Gallery in London.

Biography

Early life

Artemisia Lomi Gentileschi was born in Rome on 8 July 1593, although her birth certificate from the Archivio di Stato indicates she was born in 1590. She was the eldest child of Prudenzia di Ottaviano Montoni and the Tuscan painter Orazio Gentileschi. Orazio Gentileschi was a painter from Pisa. After his arrival in Rome, his painting reached its expressive peak, taking inspiration from the innovations of Caravaggio, from whom he derived the habit of painting real models, without idealising or sweetening them, instead transfiguring them into figures of powerful and realistic drama.

Baptised two days after her birth in the church of San Lorenzo in Lucina, Artemisia was primarily raised by her father following the death of her mother in 1605. It was likely at this time that Artemisia approached painting: introduced to painting in her father's workshop, Artemisia showed much more enthusiasm and talent than her brothers, who worked alongside her. She learned drawing, how to mix colour, and how to paint. By 1612, aged 18, Artemisia was known for her exemplary talents, with her father boasting that, despite having only practised painting for three years, Artemisia was peerless.

During this early period of her life, Artemisia took inspiration from her father's painting style, which had in turn been heavily influenced by the work of Caravaggio. Artemisia's approach to subject matter was different from that of her father, however, taking a highly naturalistic approach over her father's comparatively idealised works. At the same time, Artemisia had to overcome the "traditional attitude and psychological submission to this brainwashing and jealousy of her obvious talent". By doing so, she gained great respect and recognition for her work.

Her earliest surviving work, completed aged 17, is Susanna and the Elders (1610, Schönborn collection in Pommersfelden). The painting depicts the Biblical story of Susanna. The painting shows how Artemisia assimilated the realism of and effects used by Caravaggio without being indifferent to the classicism of Annibale Carracci and the Bolognese School of Baroque style.

Rape by Agostino Tassi

In 1611, Orazio was working with Agostino Tassi to decorate the vaults of Casino delle Muse inside the Palazzo Pallavicini-Rospigliosi in Rome. One day in May, Tassi visited the Gentileschi household and, when alone with Artemisia, raped her. Another man, Cosimo Quorli, played a part in the rape. A female friend of Gentileschi, Tuzia, was present during the rape, but refused to help her. 

With the expectation that they would marry in order to restore her virtue and secure her future, Artemisia started to have sexual relations with Tassi, but he reneged on his promise to marry her. Nine months after the rape, when he learned that Artemisia and Tassi were not going to be married, her father Orazio pressed charges against Tassi. The major issue of the trial was the fact that Tassi had violated the Gentileschi family's honor, and charges were not pressed for violating Artemisia.

During the ensuing seven-month trial, it was discovered that Tassi had planned to murder his wife, had engaged in adultery with his sister-in-law, and planned to steal some of Orazio's paintings. At the end of the trial, Tassi was exiled from Rome, although the sentence was never carried out. During the trial, Artemisia was tortured with thumbscrews for the purpose of verifying her testimony.

After her mother died, Artemisia had been surrounded mainly by males. When she was 17, Orazio rented the upstairs apartment of their home to a female tenant, Tuzia. Artemisia befriended Tuzia; however, Tuzia allowed Agostino Tassi and Cosimo Quorli to visit Artemisia in Artemisia's home on multiple occasions. The day the rape occurred, Artemisia cried out to Tuzia for help, but Tuzia simply ignored Artemisia and pretended she knew nothing of what happened. Art historian Jeanne Morgan Zarucchi compared Tuzia's betrayal and role in facilitating the rape to the role of a procuress who is complicit in the sexual exploitation of a prostitute.

A painting entitled Mother and Child, discovered in Crow's Nest, Australia in 1976, may or may not have been painted by Gentileschi. Presuming that it is her work, the baby has been interpreted as an indirect reference to Agostino Tassi, her rapist, as it dates to 1614, just two years after the rape. It depicts a strong and suffering woman and casts light on her anguish and expressive artistic capability.

Florentine period (1612–1620)

A month after the trial, Orazio arranged for his daughter to marry Pierantonio Stiattesi, a modest artist from Florence. Shortly afterward the couple moved to Florence. The six years she spent in Florence would be decisive both for Artemisia's family life and professional career. Artemisia became a successful court painter, enjoying the patronage of the House of Medici, and playing a significant role in courtly culture of the city. 

Artemisia's career as an artist was very successful in Florence. She was the first woman accepted into the Accademia delle Arti del Disegno (Academy of the Arts of Drawing). She maintained good relations with the most respected artists of her time, such as Cristofano Allori, and was able to garner the favour and the protection of influential people, beginning with Cosimo II de' Medici, Grand Duke of Tuscany, and especially of the Grand Duchess, Christina of Lorraine. Her acquaintance with Galileo Galilei, evident from a letter she wrote to the scientist in 1635, appears to stem from her Florentine years; indeed it may have stimulated her depiction of the compass in the Allegory of Inclination.

Her involvement in the courtly culture of Florence not only provided access to patrons, but it widened her education and exposure to the arts. She learned to read and write and became familiar with musical and theatrical performances. Such artistic spectacles helped Artemisia's approach to depicting lavish clothing in her paintings: "Artemisia understood that the representation of biblical or mythological figures in contemporary dress... was an essential feature of the spectacle of courtly life."

In 1615, she received the attention of Michelangelo Buonarroti the Younger (a younger relative of Michelangelo). Busy with the construction of the Casa Buonarroti to celebrate his noted great uncle, he asked Artemisia—along with other Florentine artists, including Agostino Ciampelli, Sigismondo Coccapani, Giovan Battista Guidoni, and Zanobi Rosi—to contribute a painting for the ceiling. Artemisia was then in an advanced state of pregnancy. Each artist was commissioned to present an allegory of a virtue associated with Michelangelo, and Artemisia was assigned the Allegory of Inclination. In this instance, Artemisia was paid three times more than any other artist participating in the series. Artemisia painted her commission in the form of a nude young woman holding a compass. Her painting is located on the Galleria ceiling on the second floor. It is believed that the subject bears a resemblance to Artemisia. Indeed, in several of her paintings, Artemisia's energetic heroines appear to be self-portraits.

Other significant works from this period include La Conversione della Maddalena (The Conversion of the Magdalene), Self-Portrait as a Lute Player (in the collection of the Wadsworth Atheneum Museum of Art), and Giuditta con la sua ancella (Judith and her Maidservant), now in the Palazzo Pitti. Artemisia painted a second version of Judith beheading Holofernes, which now is housed in the Uffizi Gallery of Florence. Her first Judith Beheading Holofernes (1612–13), smaller in size, is displayed in the Museo di Capodimonte, Naples. In fact, she was fascinated with this subject and six variations of Judith Beheading Holofernes by Artemisia are known to exist.

While in Florence, Artemisia and Pierantonio had five children. Giovanni Battista, Agnola, and Lisabella did not survive for more than a year. Their second son, Cristofano, died at the age of five after Artemisia had returned to Rome. Only Prudentia survived into adulthood. Prudentia was also known as Palmira, which has led some scholars to conclude erroneously that Artemisia had a sixth child. Prudentia was named after Artemisia's mother. It is known that Artemisia's daughter was a painter and was trained by her mother, although nothing is known of her work.

In 2011, Francesco Solinas discovered a collection of thirty-six letters, dating from about 1616 to 1620, that add startling context to the personal and financial life of the Gentileschi family in Florence. They show that Artemisia had a passionate love affair with a wealthy Florentine nobleman, named Francesco Maria Maringhi. Her husband, Pierantonio Stiattesi, was well aware of their relationship and he maintained a correspondence with Maringhi on the back of Artemisia's love letters. He tolerated it, presumably because Maringhi was a powerful ally who provided the couple with financial support. However, by 1620, rumours of the affair had begun to spread in the Florentine court and this, combined with ongoing legal and financial problems, led the couple to relocate to Rome.

Return to Rome (1620–1626/7)

Just as with the preceding decade, the early 1620s saw ongoing upheaval in Artemisia Gentileschi's life. Her son Cristofano died. Just as she arrived in Rome, her father Orazio departed for Genoa. Immediate contact with her lover Maringhi appeared to have lessened. By 1623, any mention of her husband disappears from any surviving documentation.

Her arrival in Rome offered the opportunity to cooperate with other painters and to seek patronage from the wide network of art collectors in the city, opportunities that Gentileschi grasped. One art historian noted of the period, "Artemisia's Roman career quickly took off, the money problems eased". Large-scale papal commissions were largely off-limits, however. The long papacy of Urban VIII showed a preference for large-scale decorative works and altarpieces, typified by the  baroque style of Pietro da Cortona. Gentileschi's training in easel paintings, and perhaps the suspicion that women painters did not have the energy to carry out large-scale painting cycles, meant that the ambitious patrons within Urban's circle commissioned other artists.

But Rome hosted a wide range of patrons. Spanish resident, Fernando Afan de Ribera, the 3rd Duke of Alcala, added her painting of the Magdalen and David, Christ Blessing the Children to his collection. During the same period she became associated with Cassiano dal Pozzo, a humanist and a collector and lover of arts. Dal Pozzo helped to forge relationships with other artists and patrons. Her reputation grew. The visiting French artist Pierre Dumonstier II produced a black and red chalk drawing of her right hand in 1625.

The variety of patrons in Rome also meant a variety of styles. Caravaggio's style remained highly influential and converted many painters to following his style (the so-called Caravaggisti), such as Carlo Saraceni (who returned to Venice in 1620), Bartolomeo Manfredi, and Simon Vouet. Gentileschi and Vouet would go on to have a professional relationship and would influence each other's styles. Vouet would go on to complete a portrait of Artemisia. Gentileschi also interacted with the Bentveughels group of Flemish and Dutch painters living in Rome. The Bolognese School (particularly during the 1621 to 1623 period of Gregory XV) also began to grow in popularity, and her Susanna and the Elders (1622) often is associated with the style introduced by Guercino.

Although it is sometimes difficult to date her paintings, it is possible to assign certain works by Gentileschi to these years, such as the Portrait of a Gonfaloniere, today in Bologna (a rare example of her capacity as portrait painter) and the Judith and her Maidservant today in the Detroit Institute of Arts. The Detroit painting is notable for her mastery of chiaroscuro and tenebrism (the effects of extreme lights and darks), techniques for which Gerrit van Honthorst and many others in Rome were famous.

Three Years in Venice (1626/7–1630) 

The absence of sufficient documentation makes it difficult to follow Gentileschi's movements in the late 1620s. However, it is certain that between 1626 and 1627, she moved to Venice, perhaps in search of richer commissions. Many verses and letters were composed in appreciation of her and her works in Venice. Knowledge of her commissions during the time is vague, but her The Sleeping Venus, today in the Virginia Museum of Fine Arts, Richmond, and her Esther before Ahasuerus now in the Metropolitan Museum of Art in New York, are testaments to her assimilation of the lessons of Venetian colourism.

Naples and the English period (1630–1656)
In 1630, Artemisia moved to Naples, a city rich with workshops and art lovers, in search of new and more lucrative job opportunities. The eighteenth-century biographer Bernardo de' Dominici speculated that Artemisia was already known in Naples before her arrival. She may have been invited to Naples by the Duke of Alcalá, Fernando Enriquez Afan de Ribera, who had three of her paintings: a Penitent Magdalene, Christ Blessing the Children, and David with a Harp. Many other artists, including Caravaggio, Annibale Carracci, and Simon Vouet, had stayed in Naples at some time in their lives. At that time, Jusepe de Ribera, Massimo Stanzione, and Domenichino were working there, and later, Giovanni Lanfranco and many other artists went to the city. The Neapolitan debut of Artemisia is represented by the Annunciation in the Capodimonte Museum. With the exceptions of a brief trip to London and some other journeys, Artemisia resided in Naples for the remainder of her career.

On Saturday, March 18, 1634, the traveller Bullen Reymes recorded in his diary visiting Artemisia and her daughter, Palmira ('who also paints'), with a group of fellow-Englishmen. She had relations with many renowned artists, among them Massimo Stanzione, with whom, Bernardo de' Dominici reports, she started an artistic collaboration based on a real friendship and artistic similarities. Artemisia's work influenced Stanzione's use of colours, as seen in his Assumption of the Virgin, c. 1630. De' Dominici states that "Stanzione learned how to compose an istoria from Domenichino, but learned his coloring from Artemisia".

In Naples Artemisia started working on paintings in a cathedral for the first time. They are dedicated to San Gennaro nell'anfiteatro di Pozzuoli (Saint Januarius in the amphitheater of Pozzuoli) in Pozzuoli. During her first Neapolitan period she painted the Birth of Saint John the Baptist now in the Prado in Madrid, and Corisca e il satiro (Corisca and the Satyr), today in a private collection. In these paintings, Artemisia again demonstrates her ability to adapt to the novelties of the period and to handle different subjects, instead of the usual Judith, Susanna, Bathsheba, and Penitent Magdalenes, for which she already was known. Many of these paintings were collaborations; Bathsheba, for instance, was attributed to Artemisia, Codazzi, and Gargiulo.

In 1638, Artemisia joined her father in London at the court of Charles I of England, where Orazio had become court painter and received the important job of decorating a ceiling allegory of Triumph of Peace and the Arts in the Queen's House, Greenwich built for Queen Henrietta Maria. Father and daughter were working together once again, although helping her father probably was not her only reason for travelling to London: Charles I had invited her to his court. Charles I was an enthusiastic collector, willing to incur criticism for his spending on art. The fame of Artemisia probably intrigued him, and it is not a coincidence that his collection included a painting of great suggestion, the Self-Portrait as the Allegory of Painting (which is the lead image of this article).

Orazio died suddenly in 1639. Artemisia had her own commissions to fulfil after her father's death, although there are no known works assignable with certainty to this period. It is known that Artemisia had left England by 1642, when the English Civil War was just starting. Nothing much is known about her subsequent movements. Historians know that in 1649 she was in Naples again, corresponding with Don Antonio Ruffo of Sicily, who became her mentor during this second Neapolitan period. The last known letter to her mentor is dated 1650 and makes clear that she still was fully active.

In her last known years of activity she is attributed with works that are probably commissions and follow a traditional representation of the feminine in her works.

It was once believed that Artemisia died in 1652 or 1653; however, modern evidence has shown that she was still accepting commissions in 1654, although she was increasingly dependent upon her assistant, Onofrio Palumbo. Some have speculated that she died in the devastating plague that swept Naples in 1656 and virtually wiped out an entire generation of Neapolitan artists.

Some works in this period are the Susanna and the Elders (1622) today in Brno, the Virgin and Child with a Rosary today in El Escorial, the David and Bathsheba today in Columbus, Ohio, and the Bathsheba today in Leipzig.

Her David with the Head of Goliath, rediscovered in London in 2020, has been attributed by art historian Gianni Papi to Artemisia's London period, in an article published in The Burlington Magazine.

Artistic importance
The research paper "Gentileschi, padre e figlia" (1916) by Roberto Longhi, an Italian critic, described Artemisia as "the only woman in Italy who ever knew about painting, coloring, drawing, and other fundamentals". Longhi also wrote of Judith Slaying Holofernes: "There are about fifty-seven works by Artemisia Gentileschi and 94% (forty-nine works) feature women as protagonists or equal to men". These include her works of Jael and Sisera, Judith and her Maidservant, and Esther. These characters intentionally lacked the stereotypical "feminine" traits—sensitivity, timidness, and weakness—and were courageous, rebellious, and powerful personalities (such subjects are now grouped under the name the Power of Women). A nineteenth-century critic commented on Artemisia's Magdalene stating, "no one would have imagined that it was the work of a woman. The brush work was bold and certain, and there was no sign of timidness". In Raymond Ward Bissell's view, she was well aware of how women and female artists were viewed by men, explaining why her works were so bold and defiant in the beginning of her career.

Longhi wrote:

Feminist studies increased the interest in Artemisia Gentileschi, underlining her rape and subsequent mistreatment, and the expressive strength of her paintings of biblical heroines, in which the women are interpreted as willing to manifest their rebellion against their condition. In a research paper from the catalogue of the exhibition "Orazio e Artemisia Gentileschi", which took place in Rome in 2001 (and after in New York), Judith W. Mann critiques feminist opinion of Artemisia, finding that old stereotypes of Artemisia as sexually immoral have been replaced by new stereotypes established in feminist readings of Artemisia's paintings:

Because Artemisia returned again and again to violent subject matter such as Judith and Holofernes, a repressed-vengeance theory has been postulated by some art historians, but other art historians suggest that she was shrewdly taking advantage of her fame from the rape trial to cater to a niche market in sexually charged, female-dominated art for male patrons.

The most recent critics, starting from the difficult reconstruction of the entire catalogue of the Gentileschi, have tried to give a less reductive reading of the career of Artemisia, placing it in the context of the different artistic environments in which the painter participated. A reading such as this restores Artemisia as an artist who fought with determination—using the weapon of personality and of the artistic qualities—against the prejudices expressed against women painters; being able to introduce herself productively in the circle of the most respected painters of her time, embracing a series of pictorial genres that probably were more ample and varied than her paintings suggest.

Feminist perspectives
Feminist interest in Artemisia Gentileschi dates from the 1970s when the feminist art historian Linda Nochlin published an article entitled "Why Have There Been No Great Women Artists?" in which that question was dissected and analysed. The article explores the definition of "great artists" and posited that oppressive institutions, not lack of talent, have prevented women from achieving the same level of recognition that men received in art and other fields. Nochlin said that studies on Artemisia and other women artists were "worth the effort" in "adding to our knowledge of women's achievement and of art history generally." According to the foreword by Douglas Druick in Eve Straussman-Pflanzer's Violence & Virtue: Artemisia's Judith Slaying Holofernes, Nochlin's article prompted scholars to make more of an attempt to "integrate women artists into the history of art and culture."

Artemisia and her oeuvre became a focus again, having had little attention in art history scholarship save Roberto Longhi's article "Gentileschi padre e figlia (Gentileschi, father and daughter)" in 1916 and Bissell's article "Artemisia Gentileschi—A New Documented Chronology" in 1968. As Artemisia and her work began to garner new attention among art historians and feminists, more literature about her, fictional and biographical, was published. A fictional account of her life by Anna Banti, wife of critic Roberto Longhi, was published in 1947. This account was well received by literary critics, but was criticized by feminists, notably Laura Benedetti, for being lenient in historical accuracy in order to draw parallels between author and artist. The first full, factual account of Artemisia's life, The Image of the Female Hero in Italian Baroque Art, was published in 1989 by Mary Garrard, a feminist art historian. She then published a second, smaller book entitled Artemisia Gentileschi around 1622: The Shaping and Reshaping of an Artistic Identity in 2001 that explored the artist's work and identity. Garrard noted that analysis of Artemisia's oeuvre lacks focus and stable categorization outside of "woman", although Garrard questions whether femaleness is a legitimate category by which to judge her art at all.

Artemisia is known for her portrayals of subjects from the Power of Women group, for example her versions of Judith Slaying Holofernes. She is also known for the rape trial in which she was involved, which scholar Griselda Pollock has argued had unfortunately become the repeated "axis of interpretation of the artist's work". Gentileschi's status in popular culture is deemed by Pollock to be due less to her work than to the sensationalism caused by the persistent focus on the rape trial during which she was tortured. Pollock offers a counter reading of the artist's dramatic narrative paintings, refusing to see the Judith and Holofernes images as responses to rape and the trial. Instead, Pollock points out that the subject of Judith and Holofernes is not a revenge theme, but a story of political courage and indeed, collaboration by two women committing a daring political murder in a war situation. Pollock seeks to shift attention from sensationalism toward deeper analysis of Gentileschi's paintings, notably of death and loss, suggesting the significance of her childhood bereavement as a source of her singular images of the dying Cleopatra. Pollock also argues that Gentileschi's success in the seventeenth century depended on her producing paintings for patrons, often portraying subjects they selected that reflected contemporary tastes and fashions. She aims to place Gentileschi's career in its historical context of taste for dramatic narratives of heroines from the Bible or classical sources.

In another vein entirely, American professor Camille Paglia has argued that modern feminist preoccupation with Artemisia is misguided and that her accomplishments have been overstated: "Artemisia Gentileschi was simply a polished, competent painter in a Baroque style created by men." Nonetheless, according to The National Gallery, Artemisia worked "in Rome, Florence, Venice, Naples, and London, for the highest echelons of European society, including the Grand Duke of Tuscany and Philip IV of Spain".

Feminist literature tends to revolve around the event of Artemisia's rape, largely portraying her as a traumatised, but noble survivor whose work became characterised by sex and violence as a result of her experience.  interpreted the film by Agnès Merlet as a typical example of the inability of popular culture to look at the painter's remarkable career over many decades and in many major centres of art, rather than this one episode. A literature review by Laura Benedetti, "Reconstructing Artemisia: Twentieth Century Images of a Woman Artist", concluded that Artemisia's work is often interpreted according to the contemporary issues and personal biases of the authors. Feminist scholars, for example, have elevated Artemisia to the status of feminist icon, which Benedetti attributed to Artemisia's paintings of formidable women and her success as an artist in a male-dominated field while also being a single mother. Elena Ciletti, author of Gran Macchina a Bellezza, wrote that "The stakes are very high in Artemisia's case, especially for feminists, because we have invested in her so much of our quest for justice for women, historically and currently, intellectually and politically."

Feminist scholars suggest that Artemisia wanted to take a stand against the stereotype of female submissiveness. One example of this symbolism appears in her Corisca and the Satyr, created between 1630 and 1635. In the painting, a nymph runs away from a satyr. The satyr attempts to grab the nymph by her hair, but the hair is a wig. Here, Artemisia depicts the nymph to be quite clever and to be actively resisting the aggressive attack of the satyr.

Other female painters of her time
For a woman at the beginning of the seventeenth century, Artemisia being a painter represented an uncommon and difficult choice, but not an exceptional one. Artemisia was aware of "her position as a female artist and the current representations of women's relationship to art." This is evident in her allegorical self portrait, Self Portrait as "La Pittura", which shows Artemisia as a muse, "symbolic embodiment of the art" and as a professional artist.

Before Artemisia, between the end of the 1500s and the beginning of 1600s, other women painters had successful careers, including Sofonisba Anguissola (born in Cremona around 1530). Later Fede Galizia (born in Milan or Trento in 1578) painted still lifes, and a Judith with the Head of Holofernes.

Italian Baroque painter Elisabetta Sirani was another female artist from this same time period. Sirani's painting Allegory Painting of Clio shares a common colour scheme with Artemisia's work. Elisabetta gained considerable success before her death aged 27.

In popular culture

In novels and fiction 

 The first writer who produced a novel around the figure of Artemisia may have been George Eliot in Romola (1862–63), where some aspects of Artemisia's story, while set in the Florence in her time, are recognisable, but much embroidered.
 A later and clearer use of Artemisia's story appears in Anna Banti's Artemisia. Banti's book is written in an "open diary" format, in which she maintains a dialogue with Artemisia.
 Susan Vreeland published The Passion of Artemisia (2002), a biographical novel based on her life.
 She appears in Eric Flint's Ring of Fire alternate history series, being mentioned in 1634: The Galileo Affair (2004) and figuring prominently in 1635: The Dreeson Incident (2008), as well as appearing in a number of shorter stories in the 1632 universe.
 The novel Maestra (2016) by L.S. Hilton includes Artemisia as a central reference for the main character, and several of her paintings are discussed.
 The novel Salem's Cipher (2016) by Jess Lourey used Artemisia's painting Judith Beheading Holofernes to send a clue.
 The prose novel Blood Water Paint by Joy McCullough tells Artemisia's story in poetic form.
 The manga Arte, set in 16th century Florence, is loosely based on Artemisia.
 A fictional painting by Artemisia, "The Lute Player", is a central element in Daniel Silva's 2021 espionage novel The Cellist.

In the theatre 
 Artemisia, and more specifically her painting Judith Beheading Holofernes, are referred to in Wendy Wasserstein's play The Heidi Chronicles (1988), in which the main character, Heidi, lectures about it as part of her art history course on female painters. At the end of the play, Heidi adopts a daughter she names Judy, which is at least a partial reference to the painting.
 Canadian playwright Sally Clark wrote several stage plays based on the events leading up to and following the rape of Artemisia. Life Without Instruction, commissioned by Nightwood Theatre in 1988, premiered at Theatre Plus Toronto on August 2, 1991.
 Blood Water Paint, a play by Joy McCullough, was turned into the novel Blood Water Paint (2017) by the same author. Productions of the play took place in Seattle in 2015 and 2019.
 Breach Theatre's It's True, It's True, It's True (2018) is a play derived from the transcripts of the trial, translated from Latin and Italian into conversational English, and was first performed at the Edinburgh Fringe Festival, where it won The Stage Edinburgh award and a Fringe First award. After touring the UK, it was then broadcast on BBC Four on 9 February 2020.
 The Anthropologists, a theater company in New York City, created a solo show, Artemisia’s Intent, inspired by the life of Artemisia Gentileschi.
 The speculative nonfiction opera entitled Artemisia, with music by Laura Schwendinger and libretto by Ginger Strand, was performed in New York City by Trinity Wall Street at St. Paul's Chapel with Christopher Alden, director and Lidiya Yankovskaya, conductor, March 7 and 9, 2019; and in San Francisco by the Left Coast Chamber Ensemble, June 1 and 2, 2019.

On television 
 Artemisia's life and the Judith Slaying Holofernes painting played a pivotal role in the ITV miniseries Painted Lady (1997), starring Helen Mirren.
 An episode of the British television crime series Endeavour (2018) depicts a series of murders inspired by Artemisia's biblical paintings of women taking vengeance on the men who harmed or abused them.
An unnamed painting by Artemisia Gentileschi is mentioned in The Crown (season 3, episode 1). Prince Philip, seeing the painting, asks Sir Anthony Blunt who the artist is, Blunt replies 'Artemisia Gentileschi', to which Philip says 'Never heard of him'. 'Her, sir,' Blunt corrects him.

In other artworks 
 Artemisia Gentileschi is one of the women represented in The Dinner Party, an installation artwork by Judy Chicago that was first exhibited in 1979.

In cinema 
 The film Artemisia (1997), by Agnès Merlet, tells the story of Artemisia's entry into being a professional artist, her relationship with Tassi, and the trial. Merlet exonerates Tassi of rape, however, not only by depicting their sex as loving and consensual (which was controversial when the film was released), but also by two ahistorical fabrications: Artemisia refuses under torture to say that she was raped, while Tassi falsely confesses to rape to stop Artemisia's torment.

Gallery

See also 
 Women artists of the Baroque Era

References
Citations

Sources 
 
 
  (also at The Metropolitan Museum of art

Further reading

External links

 The Life and Art of Artemisia Gentileschi
 Paintings by Gentileschi
 Brooklyn Museum Artemisia Gentileschi
 Art History Archive Baroque Artemia Gentileschi
 "Violence and Virtue: Artemisia Gentileschi's Judith Slaying Holofernes
 Artemisia Gentileschi Biography
 10 Facts You May Not Know About Artemisia Gentileschi

Artemisia Gentileschi
1593 births
1650s deaths
17th-century Italian painters
17th-century Italian women artists
17th-century Italian women
Caravaggisti
Catholic painters
Court painters
Female Catholic artists
Italian Baroque painters
Italian women painters
Painters from Rome
People of the Papal States
Rape in Italy